Akhtiyal (Axtiyal) is a rural locality (a village) in Istyaksky Selsoviet, Yanaulsky District, Bashkortostan, Russia. The population was 353 as of 2010. There are 4 streets.

Geography 
Akhtiyal is located 8 km southeast of Yanaul (the district's administrative centre) by road. Sabanchi is the nearest rural locality.

References 

Rural localities in Yanaulsky District